Marie-Anne de Roumier-Robert was an 18th-century French writer. She wrote one of the earliest known works of science fiction, Voyage de Milord Céton dans les Sept Planètes ("Lord Seton's Voyage Among the Seven Planets", 1765).

References

External links
 

Year of birth missing
Year of death missing
18th-century French writers
18th-century French women writers
French feminist writers
French science fiction writers
Women science fiction and fantasy writers
French women novelists